Claude Koutob Naoto (born December 26, 1995) is a Togolese footballer who plays as a winger or forward for Stade Poitevin FC.

Club career
Koutob Naoto started his career in Togo with Gbikinti before moving to Tunisian side AS Marsa in 2014.

After making two professional appearances in the Tunisian Ligue Professionnelle 1, Koutob Naoto left Marsa for French outfit Poiré-sur-Vie.

International career
Koutob Naoto was called up to the Togo national football team for a 2014 World Cup qualification game against the DR Congo on 8 September 2013. However, he never came off the bench.

References

External links
 
 

1995 births
Living people
Togolese footballers
Togo international footballers
Association football wingers
Gbikinti FC de Bassar players
AS Marsa players
Vendée Poiré-sur-Vie Football players
Les Herbiers VF players
Championnat National players
Championnat National 2 players
Championnat National 3 players
21st-century Togolese people